Jesse West,  3rd Eye (born December 4, 1967 in the South Bronx, New York) is a producer/rapper. Jesse grew up in the Bronx River Projects, where the Master/Teacher DJ Afrika Bambaataa founded the Universal Zulu Nation.

History 
Born Jesse Williams III, he was one of the first rappers signed to Motown Records and, in 1989, released the album "No Prisoners". He then went on to produce hit songs with many artists including GZA, Xzibit, Heavy D and KRS-One among others.  One of Bad Boy Records' original "Hitmen", West recorded Biggie Smalls first demo as well as produced remixes for songs on Mary J. Blige's album, What's the 411?

As rapper 3rd Eye, it has been argued that Jesse West was the first rapper to use the term "bling"  on Super Cat's 1993 hit "Dolly My Baby (Remix)" - a song that West produced and also featured Puff Daddy and a young Biggie Smalls in his recording debut.

Jesse West continues to create tracks and produce music for artists.

Discography 
Solo Albums

Production Credits

Remixes

Other Appearances
"Guest Appearances"

Sampling 
"For James" - James Brown "Funky Drummer", "Soul Power"
"The Master" - Talking Heads "Once in a Lifetime", Grace Jones "Slave to the Rhythm"
"I Saw You" - Jackson Five "My Little Baby"

References 

 Platform 8470: The Official Hip Hopzine

External links 

 Jesse West at MySpace

1967 births
American rappers
Hip hop record producers
Living people
Motown artists
20th-century American rappers
21st-century American rappers
20th-century African-American musicians
21st-century African-American musicians
Hit Squad members